Events in the year 1955 in Turkey.

Parliament
 10th Parliament of Turkey

Incumbents
President – Celal Bayar
Prime Minister – Adnan Menderes
Leader of the opposition – İsmet İnönü

Ruling party and the main opposition
  Ruling party – Democrat Party (DP) 
  Main opposition – Republican People's Party (CHP)

Cabinet
21st government of Turkey (up to 9 December)
22nd government of Turkey (from 9 December)

Events
 24 January – Mine accident in Zonguldak
19 February – Agreement between Turkey and Greece on the rehabilitation of the River Meriç.
24 February – CENTO agreement
15 April – Fuat Köprülü one of the founders of the Democrat Party (DP) resigned from the government
22 May – Polemics in the parliament
16 July – The magnitude 6.8 Soke–Aydin earthquake shook the Aydın Province with a maximum Mercalli intensity of IX (Violent), causing severe damage and four deaths.
6/7 September – Unchecked demonstrations in İstanbul and the other big cities against Greeks. Martial law in three cities.
15 October – A crisis in the ruling party about the right to prove in press. Nine MPs were expelled from the party and Ten MPs resigned.
23 October – Census (the population: 24,064,763)
13 November – Local elections
20 December – Liberty Party was founded by the MPs expelled from the DP.

Notable births
22 January – Filiz Koçali, feminist activist
2 March – Samet Aybaba, former football player and currently coach
20 March – Zerrin Güngör, president of the Council of State
1 April – İlhan İrem , singer
5 May – Mehmet Terzi, medal winning long distance runner 
18 May – Altan Erkekli, actor
23 May – Mansur Yavaş, politician
31 May – Nilüfer Yumlu, singer
18 July – Banu Avar, journalist, political commentator
14 August – Güler Sabancı, industrialist
3 September – Cem Boyner, industrialist
3 October – Buket Uzuner, writer
2 December, Murat Bardakçı, journalist and historian

Notable deaths
22 May – Nene Hatun, heroine who fought against the Russians during the Battle of Erzurum (born 1857)
1 July – Adnan Adıvar, politician and historian (born 1882)
2 July – Fatma Seher Erden, heroine who fought during the Turkish War of Independence (Kara Fatma; born 1888)
25 July – Ali Naci Karacan, journalist and publisher (born 1896)
21 August – Münir Hüsrev Göle, politician (born 1890)

Gallery

References

 
Years of the 20th century in Turkey